Events from the year 1780 in Sweden

Incumbents
 Monarch – Gustav III

Events

 
 
 
 August - Sweden, Denmark-Norway and Russia conduct an alliance of neutrality against Great Britain's privateers.

Births

 July 15 – Emilie Petersen, Swedish philanthropist (d. 1859)

 
 
 4 July - Sofia Hjärne, baroness (died 1860)
 - Bror Cederström, minister of war  (died 1877) 
 - Anna Carlström, brothel madam  (died 1850)

Deaths

 April 5 – Ulrika Strömfelt, Swedish courtier (b. 1724)

 5 April - Ulrika Strömfelt, politically active courtier (born 1724)

 - Martin Nürenbach, stage artist and theater director (year of birth unknown)

References

External links

 
Years of the 18th century in Sweden
Sweden

Notes